Elin Wahlström (born 20 January 1993) is a Swedish football midfielder who previously played for Swedish club Eskilstuna United. In August 2017, she signed for AIK in the SwedishElitettan.

References

External links 
Eskilstuna United DFF
Runner-up
 Damallsvenskan: 2015

External links 
 

1993 births
Living people
Swedish women's footballers
Eskilstuna United DFF players
Damallsvenskan players
Women's association football midfielders